The Princeton Infants were a minor league baseball teams based in Princeton, Kentucky. In 1905, Princeton played as members of the Kentucky–Illinois–Tennessee League. Hosting home games at League Park, the Infants' 1905 season was cut short by the Yellow fever epidemic.

History
The Princeton Infants began minor league play in 1905. Princeton became members of the six–team 1905 Kentucky–Illinois–Tennessee League, nicknamed as the KITTY League. Princeton was joined by the Cairo Giants, Henderson Hens, Hopkinsville Browns, Paducah Indians and Vincennes Alices in the Class D level league.

The Princeton use of the "Infants" moniker likely derives from new or young rostered teams being called the "Infants" or "Lambs" during the era.

Beginning league play on May 4, 1905, the Princeton Infants finished in fourth place with a 46–61 record, playing under managers R. Meredeth and John Ray. During the season, the Henderson and Hopkinsville franchises both disbanded on July 18, 1905, reducing the league to four teams. On August 17, 1905, the Kentucky–Illinois–Tennessee League season was ended early, with National Association permission, due to the Yellow fever epidemic. The Infants finished 24.0 games behind the 1st place Paducah Indians (68–35) in the final standings. The Vincennes Alices (65–41) and Cairo Giants (46–57) finished ahead of Princeton in the standings. Princeton was followed by the Hopkinsville Browns (31–44) and Henderson Hens (29–47).

On June 27, 1905, at League Park in Princeton, the Princeton Infants and Hopkinsville played a 21–inning game. In front of 200 fans, Hopkinsville won the game 4–2. The game took 3:10 to play and ended at 6:10PM.

The Princeton franchise permanently folded following the 1905 season. Princeton, Kentucky has not hosted another minor league team.

The ballpark
The 1905 Princeton Infants hosted minor league home games at League Park.

Year-by-year records

Notable alumni
No players on the 1905 Princeton roster played in the major leagues.

References

External references
Baseball Reference

Defunct minor league baseball teams
Defunct baseball teams in Kentucky
Baseball teams established in 1905
Baseball teams disestablished in 1905
Kentucky-Illinois-Tennessee League teams
Princeton, Kentucky
1905 establishments in Kentucky
1905 disestablishments in Kentucky